Gyula Vantara (born November 19, 1954) is a Hungarian engineer and politician, who was elected mayor of Békéscsaba in the 2006 local elections. He was also member of the National Assembly (MP) for Békéscsaba (Békés County Constituency I) from 2010 to 2018.

Personal life
He speaks beside Hungarian also English and Slovak. His role model is Lajos Haán Lutheran pastor of Békéscsaba. He is married to Mária Vantara chemist. They have two sons, Gyula Gábor and Tamás.

References

1954 births
Living people
Hungarian engineers
Mayors of places in Hungary
Fidesz politicians
Members of the National Assembly of Hungary (2010–2014)
Members of the National Assembly of Hungary (2014–2018)
People from Békéscsaba
20th-century Hungarian people